Grønlands Seminariums Sportklub  (also known as GSS Nuuk) is a sports club from Greenland based in Nuuk. They compete in football, handball and volleyball.

Achievements 
Greenlandic Football Championship: 4
Champion : 1972, 1973, 1975, 1976
Women's Greenlandic Football Championship: 2
Champion : 2018, 2019

Notable Former Players 
 Asii Berthelsen (2018-2019)

References

Football clubs in Greenland
Association football clubs established in 1944
Sport in Nuuk
1944 establishments in Greenland
Handball clubs in Greenland